"Po' Folks" (featuring Anthony Hamilton) is the three time Grammy-nominated second hit single by the Kentucky rap group Nappy Roots.

Overview
The beat was produced by Trackboyz. The song's signature concept, verse, and chorus was written by R. Prophet, a prolific member of Nappy Roots. Discussing the meaning of "Po' Folks," Prophet told MTV.com that the lyrics did not only speak of being poor as an economic issue. "It's a state of mind. It's not so bad being poor when you've got your family and God in your life and you have different values that, when it comes down to it, matter. A lot of other things really don't matter when God is knocking at your door." Po' Folks was released in 2002 and taken from Nappy Roots's debut album, Watermelon, Chicken & Gritz. It peaked at number 21 in the U.S. and features vocals by Anthony Hamilton who sung the soulful hook.

Anthony Hamilton's performance, as well as the success of the song, is credited for launching Anthony Hamilton's career in mainstream music .

Remix
The official remix is called, "Po' Folks (Collipark Remix)", and features the Ying Yang Twins. It was produced by Mr. Collipark.

Charts

Weekly charts

Year-end charts

Awards and nominations

2003
 2003 Grammy Award nominations for Best Rap/Sung Collaboration.

References

2002 singles
Nappy Roots songs
Songs about poverty
Atlantic Records singles